Nogometni klub Vis Simm-Bau (English: Football Club Vis Simm-Bau) is a professional association football club from the village of Kosova near Maglaj, that is situated in Bosnia and Herzegovina. 

Vis Simm-Bau currently plays in the First League of the Federation of Bosnia and Herzegovina after getting promoted from the Second League of the Federation of Bosnia and Herzegovina (Group Center) in the 2019–20 season. The club plays its home matches on the Grabovac Stadium which has a capacity of 1,200 seats.

Honours

Domestic

League
Second League of the Federation of Bosnia and Herzegovina:
Winners (1): 2019–20 
League of Zenica-Doboj Canton:
Winners (1): 2017–18

Club officials

Coaching staff
{|
|valign="top"|

Other information

Managerial history
 Ekrem Bradarić (February 1, 2019 – June 30, 2019)
 Ajdin Mrguda (August 1, 2019 – December 30, 2019)
 Jasmin Džidić (February 1, 2020 – September 21, 2020)
 Ajdin Mrguda (September 21, 2020 – March 8, 2021)
 Darko Vojvodić (March 10, 2021 – present)

References

External links
NK Vis Simm-Bau at Facebook

NK Vis Simm-Bau
Football clubs in Yugoslavia
Football clubs in Bosnia and Herzegovina
Sport in the Federation of Bosnia and Herzegovina
Association football clubs established in 1975
1975 establishments in Bosnia and Herzegovina